Future Zone is a 1990 science-fiction film written and directed by David A. Prior and starring David Carradine.  It was the sequel to the 1989 film Future Force.

Synopsis
John Tucker, a bounty hunter comes face to face with the most dangerous ordeal of his career but he is armed (unknowingly) with his most powerful weapon yet, his son, who travels back in time to save him from a brutal gang of criminals.

Cast
 David Carradine as John Tucker
 Ted Prior as Billy Tucker
 Patrick Culliton as Hoffman
 Gail Jensen as Marion Tucker
 Charles Napier as Mickland
 Renée Cline as Cindi
 Ronald Taft as Dugan (credited as Ron Taft)
 Jackson Bostwick as Tony Ginetti
 Dave Scott as Monroe
 Rose Stabler as Laura Kincade
 Don Stewart as Richards
 Danielle Lamprakes as Barbi
 Townsend Ellis as Williams

Production

Was Whit Norris' first ever feature film as sound mixer.

Reception

Creature Feature gave the movie 2 of 5 stars.

References

External links

1990 science fiction films
American science fiction films
1990 films
Films about time travel
Films directed by David A. Prior
1990s English-language films
1990s American films